Ampliotrema is a genus of lichens in the family Graphidaceae. The genus was originally described invalidly in 2004, and validly two years later.

Species
As accepted by Species Fungorum:

Ampliotrema amplius 
Ampliotrema auratum 
Ampliotrema cocosense 
Ampliotrema dactylizum 
Ampliotrema discolor 
Ampliotrema lepadinoides 
Ampliotrema megalostoma 
Ampliotrema palaeoamplius 
Ampliotrema panamense 
Ampliotrema rimosum 
Ampliotrema sanguineum 
Ampliotrema sorediatum

References

Ostropales
Ostropales genera
Lichen genera
Taxa named by Klaus Kalb
Taxa described in 2006